Çavlı may refer to the following villages in Turkey:

 Çavlı, Dicle
 Çavlı, Savaştepe